Dorcadion meschniggi is a species of beetle in the family Cerambycidae. It was described by Breit in 1928. It is known from Greece.

References

meschniggi
Beetles described in 1928